A list of notable politicians of the Partito d'Azione of Italy:

B
Enzo Biagi
Ranuccio Bianchi Bandinelli
Nino Bixio
Norberto Bobbio
Giorgio Bocca
Pietro Bucalossi

C
Piero Calamandrei
Aldo Capitini
Carlo Cassola
Nicola Chiaromonte
Carlo Azeglio Ciampi
Tristano Codignola
Lucio Colletti
Enrico Cuccia

D
Francesco De Martino
Guido De Ruggiero
Francesco de Sanctis

F
Oriana Fallaci
Vittorio Foa
Franco Fortini

G
Leone Ginzburg

L
Ugo La Malfa
Carlo Levi
Primo Levi
Emilio Lussu
Joyce Lussu

M
Raffaele Mattioli
Luigi Meneghello
Eugenio Montale
Augusto Monti

P
Luigi Pareyson
Ferruccio Parri

R
Carlo Ludovico Ragghianti
Ernesto Rossi

S
Luigi Salvatorelli
Gaetano Salvemini
Guido Seborga
Altiero Spinelli

V
Leo Valiani
Franco Venturi
Bruno Visentini
Edoardo Volterra

Z
Bruno Zevi

Action Party
Main|